Maciej Ustynowicz (born 23 February 1983 in Warsaw) is a Polish speedskater. He competed for Poland at the 2006 and 2010 Winter Olympics.

Personal records

References

External links 
 

1983 births
Living people
Polish male speed skaters
Olympic speed skaters of Poland
Speed skaters at the 2006 Winter Olympics
Speed skaters at the 2010 Winter Olympics
Speed skaters from Warsaw